USRC Commodore Perry may refer to the following United States Revenue Cutter Service ships that are named for Oliver Hazard Perry:
 , a revenue cutter in service from 1865 through 1883.
 , a revenue cutter in service from 1884 through 1910.

See also
 

Ships of the United States Revenue Cutter Service
Ship names